37 Days is an album by American singer Beth Hart released in parts of Europe in 2007, followed in the UK in 2008. A DVD version of the album is also available, where each track is played to synced pro-shot video footage of that given song being recorded in studio. The UK version of the CD release contains live bonus tracks of "LA Song," "Learning to Live," and "Leave the Light On" tacked on at the end of the disc. The track "Soul Shine" is a cover of the song "Soulshine", originally written by Allman Brothers guitarist Warren Haynes.

The album name, 37 Days, refers to how long it took to record the album.

Track listing

Charts

Certifications

References

2007 albums
Beth Hart albums